The 2014 AFC Challenge Cup qualification phase determined the teams which advanced to the final tournament. The qualification draw was held on 11 December 2012, in AFC House in Kuala Lumpur, Malaysia.

Qualified nations

Notes

Format
Twenty teams expressed their interest to take part before the deadline of 7 September 2012. The Northern Mariana Islands made their Challenge Cup debut after having been approved by the AFC to participate (the Northern Mariana Islands is an associate member of the AFC).

It was decided that starting from this tournament, an automatic qualification place will be given to the AFC Challenge Cup host. The hosting rights were given to Maldives in the AFC Competitions Committee meeting on 28 November.

The twenty teams involved in the qualification draw were drawn into five groups of four teams, with each group containing one team from each of the following seeding pots. Teams in each group will play a single round-robin at a pre-determined host country. The five group winners plus the two best second-placed teams will qualify for the finals.

Below the table of national teams that participated in this qualifications along with their FIFA ranking (and points) as of 7 November 2012 (in bracket with their numbers of ranking are bolded)

Following teams did not enter qualifications :

Notes : 
It was reported on 26 October 2012 that Cambodia withdrew, citing financial and competitive concerns. However, they were included in the draw.
Bangladesh were not one of the original 20 teams which the AFC announced as entrants.
Brunei withdrew their participation a day before the AFC Challenge Cup qualifier in Manila citing unavoidable circumstances. The last minute withdrawal puts the country in a possible AFC Challenge Cup ban. Brunei were supposed to be in Group E of the AFC Challenge Cup qualifiers against hosts Philippines, Cambodia and Turkmenistan.

Groups
Groups A, C and D were played 2–6 March 2013, Group B was played 17–21 March 2013, and Group E was played 22–26 March 2013.

Tiebreakers
In each group, the teams are ranked according to points (3 points for a win, 1 point for a tie, 0 points for a loss) and tie breakers are in following order:
Greater number of points obtained in the group matches between the teams concerned
Goal difference resulting from the group matches between the teams concerned
Greater number of goals scored in the group matches between the teams concerned (Away goals do not apply)
Goal difference in all the group matches
Greater number of goals scored in all the group matches
Kicks from the penalty mark if only two teams are involved and they are both on the field of play
Fewer score calculated according to the number of yellow and red cards received in the group matches (1 point for each yellow card, 3 points for each red card as a consequence of two yellow cards, 3 points for each direct red card, 4 points for each yellow card followed by a direct red card)
Drawing of lots

Group A

Matches played in Myanmar (all times UTC+6:30).

Group B

Matches played in Kyrgyzstan (all times UTC+6).

Group C

Matches played in Laos (all times UTC+7).

Group D

Matches played in Nepal (all times UTC+5:45).
Match times were originally scheduled at 14:30 and 17:30 but were changed to 14:00 and 17:05 due to technical reasons.
Match times of the last round of matches were changed again to 15:15 and 18:15 due to bandh organized by political parties.

Group E

Matches played in the Philippines (all times UTC+8).
On 20 March 2013, Brunei withdrew due to "unavoidable circumstances".

Ranking of second-placed teams
To determine the two best second-placed teams, the following criteria were used:
Number of points obtained in the group matches
Goal difference in the group matches
Greater number of goals scored in the group matches
Fewer score calculated according to the number of yellow and red cards received in the group matches (1 point for each yellow card, 3 points for each red card as a consequence of two yellow cards, 3 points for each direct red card, 4 points for each yellow card followed by a direct red card)
Drawing of lots

For this ranking, the non-participation of Brunei in Group E meant that the results of the matches in the four other groups between the runner-up and the bottom-placed team were declared null and void based on Article 16.1 and Appendix 2 of the tournament regulations.

Goalscorers
5 goals
 Phil Younghusband

3 goals

 Shakhawat Hossain Rony
 David Tetteh
 Bharat Khawas
 Khaled Salem

2 goals

 Balal Arezou
 Toklis Ahmed
 Jason Cunillfe
 Sunil Chhetri
 Jewel Raja
 Vilayout Sayyabounsou
 Soe Min Oo
 Abdelhamid Abuhabib
 Alaa Atiya
 Haytham Dheeb
 Javier Patiño
 Chathura Gunaratne
 Malik Migara
 Jamshed Ismailov
 Wladimir Baýramow

1 goal

 Sandjar Ahmadi
 Ashraf Mahmud Linkon
 Lee Meng-Chian
 Lee Tai-Lin
 Ian Mariano
 Clifford Miranda
 Robin Singh
 Sangvone Phimmasen
 Khampheng Sayavutthi
 Viengsavanh Sayyaboun
 Soukaphone Vongchiengkham
 Tsedenbal Tumenjargal
 Kyaw Zayar Win
 Kyi Lin
 Pai Soe
 Pyae Phyo Aung
 Soe Kyaw Kyaw
 Sandip Rai
 Santosh Sahukhala
 Raju Tamang
 Hassan Bashir
 Kalim Ullah
 Eyad Abugharqud
 Carli de Murga
 Stephan Schröck
 Charitha Ratnayake
 Jahongir Ergashev
 Khurshed Makhmudov
 Guwanç Abylow
 Arslanmyrat Amanow
 Gurbangeldi Batyrow
 Berdi Şamyradow

Own goal
 Om Thavrak (playing against Turkmenistan)

References

External links
AFC Challenge Cup, the-AFC.com

Qualification
2013 in Asian football